29th National Board of Review Awards
Late December, 1957
The 29th National Board of Review Awards were announced in late December, 1957.

Top Ten Films 
The Bridge on the River Kwai
12 Angry Men
The Spirit of St. Louis
The Rising of the Moon
Albert Schweitzer
Funny Face
The Bachelor Party
The Enemy Below
A Hatful of Rain
A Farewell to Arms

Top Foreign Films 
Ordet
Gervaise
Torero!
The Red Balloon
A Man Escaped

Winners 
Best Film: The Bridge on the River Kwai
Best Foreign Film: Ordet
Best Actor: Alec Guinness (The Bridge on the River Kwai)
Best Actress: Joanne Woodward (The Three Faces of Eve, No Down Payment)
Best Supporting Actor: Sessue Hayakawa (The Bridge on the River Kwai)
Best Supporting Actress: Sybil Thorndike (The Prince and the Showgirl)
Best Director: David Lean (The Bridge on the River Kwai)
Special Citation: Funny Face (for photographic innovations)

External links 
National Board of Review of Motion Pictures :: Awards for 1957

1957
National Board of Review Awards
National Board of Review Awards
National Board of Review Awards
National Board of Review Awards